Retro was the only EP (7") by Ultravox, then Ultravox!, released on 10 February 1978. It was the last recording released by the band as Ultravox!. Also this was the last disc featuring original guitarist Stevie Shears, who left the band after its release.

The EP featured four live tracks recorded in 1977 or early 1978, while Ultravox! were promoting one of their first two albums, Ultravox! and Ha! Ha! Ha!, both released in 1977. An Australian only 12" was also released with the added tracks Quirks and Modern Love. These were previously available as a free 7" single given away with the first 10000 copies of "Ha Ha Ha". In or around 1990 the Australian record company 'Festival Records' made a limited amount of cd singles of the 6 track Retro EP but shelved the release. It is not known if any were issued for sale.

In 2006, Island Records re-released the tracks, adding them to remastered versions of Ultravox!'s albums. The tracks from side two of the EP were included on the reissue of Ultravox! and the side one tracks on the reissue of Ha! Ha! Ha!.

Track listing
All tracks written by Ultravox!

A-Side
The Man Who Dies Every Day (Live At Huddersfield Polytechnic)
Young Savage (Live At The Marquee)

B-Side
The Wild, The Beautiful And The Damned (Live At The Rainbow)
My Sex (Live At Huddersfield Polytechnic)

Personnel
John Foxx: vocals
Stevie Shears: guitars
Chris Cross: bass guitar
Billy Currie: keyboards and violin
Warren Cann: drums

References

External links
Metamatic.com - Discography
Discogs.com

1978 debut EPs
Albums produced by Steve Lillywhite
1978 live albums
Live EPs
Ultravox EPs
Ultravox live albums
Island Records live albums
Island Records EPs